This is a list of the top-level leaders for religious groups with at least 50,000 adherents, and that led anytime from January 1, 701, to December 31, 800. It should likewise only name leaders listed on other articles and lists.

Christianity
Church of Rome (complete list) –
Sergius I, Pope (687–701)
John VI, Pope (701–705)
John VII, Pope (705–707)
Sisinnius, Pope (708)
Constantine, Pope (708–715)
Gregory II, Pope (715–731)
Gregory III, Pope (731–741)
Zachary, Pope (741–752)
Stephen II, Pope (752–757)
Paul I, Pope (757–767)
Stephen III, Pope (768–772)
Adrian I, Pope (772–795)
Leo III, Pope (795–816)

Church of Constantinople (complete list) –
Callinicus I, Patriarch of Constantinople (693–705)
Cyrus, Patriarch of Constantinople (705–711)
John VI, Patriarch of Constantinople (712–715)
Germanus I, Patriarch of Constantinople (715–730)
Anastasius, Patriarch of Constantinople (730–754)
Constantine II, Patriarch of Constantinople (754–766)
Nicetas I, Patriarch of Constantinople (766–780)
Paul IV, Patriarch of Constantinople (780–784)
Tarasius, Patriarch of Constantinople (784–806)

Islam

Sunni

Umayyad Caliphate (complete list) –
Abd al-Malik, Caliph (685–705)
Al-Walid I, Caliph (705–715)
Sulayman, Caliph (715–717)
Umar II, Caliph (717–720)
Yazid II, Caliph (720–724)
Hisham, Caliph (724–743)
Al-Walid II, Caliph (743–744)
Yazid III, Caliph (744)
Ibrahim, Caliph (744)
Marwan II, Caliph (744–750)

Abbasid Caliphate, Baghdad (complete list) –
as-Saffah, Caliph (750–754)
al-Mansur, Caliph (754–775)
al-Mahdi, Caliph (775–785)
al-Hadi, Caliph (785–786)
Harun al-Rashid, Caliph (786–809)

Shia
Shia Islam (complete list) –
Ali ibn Husayn Zayn al-Abidin, Imam (680–712)
Muhammad al-Baqir, Imam (712–733)
Ja'far al-Sadiq, Imam (733–765)

Twelver (Shia Islam) (complete list) –
Musa al-Kadhim, Imam (765–799)
Ali al-Ridha, Imam (799–819)

Isma'ilism (Shia Islam) (complete list) –
Isma'il ibn Jafar, Imam (to 762) Although he predeceased his father Ja'far al-Sadiq, he is still considered to have been an Imam by Isma'ilis.
Muhammad ibn Isma'il Imam (765–813)

Zaidiyyah (complete list)
Al-Hasan al-Muthanna, Imam (680–706)
Zayd ibn Ali, Imam (706–740)
Hasan ibn Zayd ibn Hasan, Imam (740–783)
Muhammad ibn Ja'far al-Sadiq, Imam (783–818)

Judaism

Karaite Judaism 

Exilarch (complete list) –
Anan ben David, major founder and Gaon (c.715–c.795/811)
Saul ben Anan, Gaon (8th century)

Rabbinic Judaism

Exilarch (complete list) –
Solomon, Exilarch (730–761)

Pumbedita Academy (complete list) –
Dodai ben Nahman, Gaon (761–767)
R. Hananya ben R. Mesharsheya, Gaon (767–771)
Malka ben R. Aha, Gaon (771–773)
Abba bar Dudai, Gaon (773–782)
Rav Shinwai, Gaon (782)
Haninai Kahana ben Abraham, Gaon (782–786)
Huna ben ha-Levi ben Isaac, Gaon (786–788)
Manasseh ben R. Joseph, Gaon (788–796)
Isaiah ha-Levi ben R. Abba, Gaon (796–798)
Joseph ben R. Shila, Gaon (798–804)

Sura Academy (complete list) –
Achai, Gaon (c.756)
Yehudai, Gaon (757-761)

Narbonne
Makhir of Narbonne, leader (late 8th century)

Persia
Abu Isa, prophet (8th century)

See also

Religious leaders by year

08th century
 
Religious Leaders